Charles Stacey (January 22, 1843 – October 17, 1924) was a United States Army soldier who received a Medal of Honor for the heroism he displayed when fighting in the Battle of Gettysburg in 1863.

Gettysburg
Stacey was born in Cambridgeshire, England. He enlisted in the Army on 13 September 1861 in the Union Army in Company D, 55th Ohio Infantry. At Gettysburg, the main body of the 55th was kept in reserve, but its skirmishers were sent out in front of Cemetery Hill. On July 2, during combat, Stacey voluntarily took a position on the skirmish line further toward the Confederates to help find snipers that were attacking the artillery on Cemetery Hill. He remained out front even after the skirmishers were called back in. He was taken prisoner and remained a POW until 19 May 1864. On October 19, 1864, he mustered out at the end of his enlistment and returned to Ohio.

Stacey is buried at Woodlawn Cemetery, Norwalk, Ohio.

Medal of Honor citation
Rank and organization: Private, Company D, 55th Ohio Infantry. Place and date: At Gettysburg, Pa., 2-July 3, 1863. Entered service at: Norwalk, Ohio. Birth: England. Date of issue: September 11, 1897.

Citation:

Voluntarily took an advanced position on the skirmish line for the purpose of ascertaining the location of Confederate sharpshooters, and under heavy fire held the position thus taken until the company of which he was a member went back to the main line.

See also

 Battle of McDowell
 Battle of Cross Keys
 Battle of Cedar Mountain
 Second Battle of Bull Run
 Battle of Chancellorsville
 Gettysburg Campaign
 Battle of Gettysburg

Notes

References

External links
Find a Grave, Charles Stacey
 Ohio in the Civil War: 55th Ohio Volunteer Infantry by Larry Stevens
 National flag of the 55th Ohio Veteran Volunteer Infantry
 Regimental flag of the 55th Ohio Infantry
 Eye witness accounts by Sergeant Luther Mesnard of Company D of OH 55th

1842 births
1924 deaths
United States Army Medal of Honor recipients
English emigrants to the United States
United States Army soldiers
People of Ohio in the American Civil War
People from Norwalk, Ohio
English-born Medal of Honor recipients
American Civil War recipients of the Medal of Honor
People from Huntingdonshire (district)